Anjar may refer to:

Anjar, Gujarat, a town and municipality in Gujarat, India
Anjar, Iran, a village in East Azerbaijan Province, Iran
Anjar, Lebanon, a town in the Bekaa valley of Lebanon

See also 
 Anjan (disambiguation)